William Rogers may refer to:

Politics
 William Rogers (Australian politician) (1818–1903), builder and pastoralist in colonial South Australia
 William Rogers (MP) (1498–1553), Member of Parliament for Norwich
 William Rogers (Wisconsin politician) (1838–1911), Wisconsin state assemblyman and judge
 William Charles Rogers (1847–1917), Cherokee leader
 William D. Rogers (1927–2007), U.S. Assistant Secretary of State for Inter-American Affairs
 William Findlay Rogers (1820–1899), congressman from New York, 1883–1884
 William H. Rogers (mayor) (1850–1935), mayor of Madison, Wisconsin
 William J. Rogers (1930–2005), Wisconsin state assemblyman
 William Nathaniel Rogers (1892–1945), congressman from New Hampshire, 1923–1924 and 1931–1936
 William P. Rogers (1913–2001), U.S. Attorney General under Dwight Eisenhower and Secretary of State under Richard Nixon
 Will Rogers (Maine politician) (born 1938), realtor and politician in Maine
 Will Rogers (Oklahoma politician) (1898–1983), congressman from Oklahoma
 Will Rogers Jr. (1911–1993), congressman from California and son of the noted humorist
 Bill Rodgers, Baron Rodgers of Quarry Bank (born 1928), British politician

Sports
 William Rogers (Canadian football) (born 1928), Canadian football player
 William Rogers (rugby union) (1902–1987), American rugby union footballer
 William Henry Hamilton Rogers, English historian and antiquarian
 Bill Rogers (golfer) (born 1951), American golfer
 Billy Rogers (footballer) (1905–1936), Welsh international footballer
 Billy Rogers (rugby league) (born 1989), Australian rugby league footballer
 Billy Rogers (soccer) (born 1949), Australian former association football player
 Will Rogers (American football) (born 2001), American football player
 Nat Rogers (William Nathaniel Rogers, 1893–1981), American baseball player

Other
 William Rogers (engraver) (fl. 1580–1610), English engraver
 William Allen Rogers (1854–1931), political cartoonist for the New York Herald
 William Barton Rogers (1804–1882), founder of MIT
 William C. Rogers III (born 1938), commander of the USS Vincennes when it shot down Iran Air Flight 655
 William Evans Rogers (1846–1913), American businessman and railroad executive
 William H. Rogers (architect) (1914–2008), English architect
 William H. Rogers Jr. (born 1957/58), American businessman
 William Hazen Rogers (1801–?), American master silversmith and pioneer in the silverplate industry
 William Percy Rogers (1914–1997), Australian zoologist
 William W. Rogers (1893–1976), United States Marine Corps general
 William Wendell Rogers (1896–1967), World War I flying ace
 Will Rogers (1879–1935), "Cherokee Kid" cowboy and humorist

Characters
 Captain William Anthony "Buck" Rogers, in Buck Rogers in the 25th Century

See also
 Bill Rogers (disambiguation)
 Billie Rogers (1917–2014), big band jazz trumpeter born Zelda Louise Smith
 Willie Rogers (disambiguation)
 William Rodgers (disambiguation)